Jacks Valley may refer to:

Jacks Valley (United States Air Force Academy), a training complex on the grounds of the United States Air Force Academy in Colorado Springs, Colorado
Jacks Valley (Nevada), a valley in Nevada